McLarnon is a surname. Notable people with the surname include:

Gerard McLarnon (1915–1997), Irish playwright and actor
Julie McLarnon (born 1971), British recording engineer and record producer
Mike McLarnon (born 1965), Canadian politician

See also
McClarnon